The contralateral organization of the forebrain (Latin: contra‚ against; latus‚ side; lateral‚ sided) is the property that the hemispheres of the cerebrum and the thalamus represent mainly the contralateral side of the body. Consequently, the left side of the forebrain mostly represents the right side of the body, and the right side of the brain primarily represents the left side of the body. The contralateral organization involves both executive and sensory functions (e.g., a left-sided brain lesion may cause a right-sided hemiplegia). The contralateral organization is present in all vertebrates but in no invertebrate. 

According to the current theory, the forebrain is twisted about the long axis of the body, so that not only the left and right sides, but also dorsal and ventral sides, are interchanged.

Anatomy 

Anatomically, the contralateral organization is manifested by major decussations (based upon the Latin notation for ten, 'deca,' as an uppercase 'X') and chiasmas (after the Greek uppercase letter 'Χ,' chi). A decussation denotes a crossing of bundles of axonal fibres inside the central nervous system. As a result of such decussations: The efferent connections of the cerebrum to the basal ganglia, the cerebellum and the spine are crossed; and the afferent connections from the spine, the cerebellum and the pons to the thalamus are crossed. Thus, motor, somatosensory, auditory, and visual primary regions in the forebrain predominantly represent the contralateral side of the body.

Two of the cranial nerves show chiasmas: (1) the chiasm of the optic tract (i.e., cranial nerve II), which originates from the eyes and inserts on the optic tectum of the midbrain; and (2) the trochlear nerve (i.e., cranial nerve IV), which originates in the ventral midbrain and innervates one of the six muscles that rotate the eye (i.e., the superior oblique muscle).

The contralateral organization is incomplete 

Although the forebrain of all vertebrates shows a contralateral organization, this contralaterality is by no means complete. Some of these exceptions are worth mentioning:
 Olfaction (i.e., smelling sense) is a noteworthy exception. Each olfactory lobe connects to the ipsilateral centers of the frontal cerebrum.
 In chondrichthyans (e.g., sharks and skates), the thalamus does not retrieve a branch from the optic tract but only from the contralateral optic tectum, so that the optic path decussates twice, and the forebrain represents the ipsilateral eye.
 In large brains, some functions tend to be strongly lateralized.  For example, the language regions (i.e., Broca's and Wernicke's area) are situated in the left hemisphere of most humans.
 Most afferent and efferent connections of the forebrain have bilateral components, especially outside the primary sensory and motor regions. As a result, a hemiplegia that is acquired at very young age can be completely compensated over time.

Theories 

According to current understanding, the contralateral organization is due to an axial twist (explained below). A number of other explanations have been published, the most popular of which is the visual map theory (explained below). A short review of existing hypotheses is given by reference. A popular-science video explains these theories in brief.

Whereas the Visual Map Theory and the Axial Twist Theory have been formulated in detail and can be regarded as scientific theories, further hypotheses tend to explain specific aspect; they propose that: a geometrical mapping argument, a coincidence of parcellation, or optical inversion on the retina of the eye, might explain the contralateral organization.

Visual map theory by Cajal 

The visual map theory was published by the famous neuroscientist and pioneer Santiago Ramón y Cajal (1898). According to this theory, the function of the optic chiasm is to repair the retinal field image on the visual cortex. The pupil in the vertebrates’ eyes inverts the image on the retina, so that the visual periphery projects to the medial side of the retina. By the chiasmatic crossing, the visual periphery is again on the outside, if one assumes that the retinal map is faithfully maintained throughout the optic tract.

The theory has a number of weaknesses. For example, the visual tracts spiral their way from the thalamic LGN to the visual cortex. (See figure; this path is known as the optic radiation.) As a result, the retinal map shows the visual periphery on the medial side. However, the central objective of the theory was to obtain a precise, faithful visual map with the medial field projecting to the medial sides of the visual cortex.

Twist theories 

Two twist theories have been proposed independently: the axial twist hypothesis by de Marc Lussanet and Jan Osse and the somatic twist hypothesis by Marcel Kinsbourne.

Axial twist hypothesis 

The axial twist hypothesis was designed to explain how the pattern of contralateral organization, decussations and chiasms develops, and why this pattern is evolutionarily stable. The evolutionary stability is truly remarkable, given that there are no known exceptions throughout the 500 million years of vertebrate evolution. According to the theory, the contralateral organization develops as follows. The early embryo is turned onto its left side, such that its left is turned to the yolk and its right is turned away from the yolk. This asymmetric orientation is compensated by asymmetric growth, to regain superficial bilateral symmetry. The anterior head region turns to the left, as shown in the schema. The forebrain is not a superficial structure, but it is so intimately associated with superficial body structures that it turns along with the anterior head. These structures will later form the eyes, nostrils and mouth.

The body behind the head compensates the asymmetric body orientation in the opposite direction, by turning to the right. (See schema.) Due to these oppositely directed compensations of the anterior head and the rest of the body, the animal becomes twisted.

The optic tract grows from the retina to the optic tectum. Because dorsal and ventral are inverted in the anterior head region, the tracts grow at first toward the ventral side, to meet in the midline to form a chiasma. Since the optic tectum lies on the dorsal midbrain, each tract then continues dorsally to the contralateral optic tectum.

The heart and bowels are internal organs with no strong integration in external body structures, so there is no evolutionary pressure to make them turn in a similar way. Rather, these organs retain their original asymmetric orientation in the body.

The axial twist hypothesis predicts that small asymmetries of the face and brain — as well as those found in the opposite direction in the trunk — remain into adulthood, and this has been confirmed experimentally.

Somatic twist hypothesis 

The idea of a somatic twist was inspired by the dorsoventral inversion hypothesis; and was proposed by Marcel Kinsbourne.

According to the dorsoventral inversion hypothesis, an ancestral deuterostome turned on its back. As a result, vertebrates have a dorsal nervous system, whereas protostomes have a ventral one. According to the somatic twist hypothesis, not the entire animal turned on its back but just the ″somatic″ part — i.e., everything behind the eyes, mouth and nostrils, including the forebrain.

Comparing inversion, somatic twist and axial twist 

The three theories are closely related. 

The somatic twist hypothesis was proposed as an improvement to the inversion hypothesis, and thus has a much wider explanatory power than its predecessor. It not only explains the inversion of the body but additionally the contralateral forebrain. 

The axial twist hypothesis was defined independently of the other two. In addition to providing rationale for the inverted body and the contralateral forebrain, it explains why the heart and bowels are asymmetric. Moreover, it is the only one of the three theories that is supported by evidence from embryological growth, which is the only theory that has been tested independently.

Evolution 

A remarkable property of the contralateral organization is that it is present in every vertebrate. Even the most distant clades — agnathans — possess an optic chiasm, and even the skull impressions of early vertebrates from the Ordovician show the presence of an optic chiasm: this idea was worked out by Kinsbourne. 
There is molecular evidence for the inversion hypothesis in almost all groups of deuterostomes. It is not known, however, what exactly was the selective pressure that caused the inversion. Twisting and asymmetric development are well known from other deuterostomes — such as Hemichordata, Echinodermata, Cephalochordata and Tunicata. Turning toward the side or upside-down also occurs frequently in these clades.

Developmental malformations 

In holoprosencephaly, the hemispheres of the cerebrum or part of it are not aligned on the left and right side but only on the frontal and occipital sides of the skull, and the head usually remains very small. According to the axial twist hypothesis, this represents an extreme case of Yakovlevian torque, and
may occur when the cerebrum does not turn during early embryology.

Cephalopagus or janiceps twins are conjoined twins who are born with two faces, one on either side of the head. These twins have two brains and two spinal chords, but these are located on the left and the right side of the body. According to the axial twist hypothesis, the two nervous systems could not turn due to the complex configuration of the body and therefore remained on either side.

See also 
Brain asymmetry
Lateralization of brain function

References 

Animal developmental biology
Evolutionary biology
Neuroscience
Cerebrum
Biology theories